
	 
Several ships have been named Woodlark after the woodlark:
	 
 was a  launched at Newcastle. She was sold into mercantile service in 1818 and then sailed as the mercantile Woodlark until the early 1830s.
 was launched at Rotherhithe. She initially traded with the Mediterranean but then switched to trading with Australia, the Dutch East Indies, and Singapore. She was wrecked in April 1828 while sailing from Australia to the Cape of Good Hope (CGH, or "the Cape") on her way to England.
 was launched at Moulmain. Circa 1835 she sailed to London and transferred to British registry. Between 1836 and 1844 she made two whaling voyages. In 1848 she transferred her ownership and registry to Sydney, from where, and New Zealand, she continued to sail until circa 1890–1891.
, of 289 tons (bm; New Act), was a brig built at Aberdeen. She was wrecked on 16 February 1868 while carrying cargo from Sydney to Newcastle, New South Wales.
She made several voyages carrying emigrants from the UK to New Zealand.

See also
 – any one of six vessels of the British Royal Navy
	 

Ship names